A nutraceutical or bioceutical is a pharmaceutical alternative which claims physiological benefits. In the US, nutraceuticals are largely unregulated, as they exist in the same category as dietary supplements and food additives by the FDA, under the authority of the Federal Food, Drug, and Cosmetic Act. The word "nutraceutical" is a portmanteau term, blending the words "nutrition" and "pharmaceutical".

Regulation
Nutraceuticals are treated differently in different jurisdictions.

Canada

Under Canadian law, a nutraceutical can either be marketed as a food or as a drug; the terms "nutraceutical" and "functional food" have no legal distinction, referring to "a product isolated or purified from foods that is generally sold in medicinal forms not usually associated with food [and] is demonstrated to have a physiological benefit or provide protection against chronic disease."

United States
The terms "nutraceutical" and "bioceutical" are not defined by US law.  Depending on its ingredients and the claims with which it is marketed, a product is regulated as a drug, dietary supplement, food ingredient, or food.

Other sources
In the global market, there are significant product quality issues. Nutraceuticals from the international market may claim to use organic or exotic ingredients, yet the lack of regulation may compromise the safety and effectiveness of products. Companies looking to create a wide profit margin may create unregulated products overseas with low-quality or ineffective ingredients.

Classification of nutraceuticals
Nutraceuticals are products derived from food sources that are purported to provide extra health benefits, in addition to the basic nutritional value found in foods. Depending on the jurisdiction, products may claim to prevent chronic diseases, improve health, delay the aging process, increase life expectancy, or support the structure or function of the body.

Dietary supplements

In the United States, the Dietary Supplement Health and Education Act (DSHEA) of 1994 defined the term "dietary supplement": “A dietary supplement is a product taken by mouth that contains a 'dietary ingredient' intended to supplement the diet. The 'dietary ingredients' in these products may include: vitamins, minerals, herbs or other botanicals, amino acids, and substances such as enzymes, organ tissues, glandulars, and metabolites. Dietary supplements can also be extracts or concentrates, and may be found in many forms such as tablets, capsules, softgels, gelcaps, liquids, or powders.”

Dietary supplements do not have to be approved by the U.S. Food and Drug Administration (FDA) before marketing, but companies must register their manufacturing facilities with the FDA and follow current good manufacturing practices (cGMPs).  With a few well-defined exceptions, dietary supplements may only be marketed to support the structure or function of the body, and may not claim to treat a disease or condition, and must include a label that says: “These statements have not been evaluated by the Food and Drug Administration. This product is not intended to diagnose, treat, cure, or prevent any disease.” The exceptions are when the FDA has reviewed and approved a health claim. In those situations the FDA also stipulates the exact wording allowed.

Functional foods

Functional foods are fortified or enriched during processing and then marketed as providing some benefit to consumers. Sometimes, additional complementary nutrients are added, such as vitamin D to milk.

Health Canada defines functional foods as “ordinary food that has components or ingredients added to give it a specific medical or physiological benefit, other than a purely nutritional effect.” In Japan, all functional foods must meet three established requirements: foods should be (1) present in their naturally occurring form, rather than a capsule, tablet, or powder; (2) consumed in the diet as often as daily; and (3) should regulate a biological process in hopes of preventing or controlling disease.

History
The word "nutraceutical" is a blend of the words "nutrition" and "pharmaceutical", coined in 1989 by Stephen L. DeFelice, founder and chairman of the Foundation of Innovation Medicine.
Indians, Egyptians, Chinese, and Sumerians are just a few civilizations that have used food as medicine. "Let food be thy medicine." is a common misquotation attributed to Hippocrates, who is considered by some to be the father of Western medicine.

The modern nutraceutical market began to develop in Japan during the 1980s. In contrast to the natural herbs and spices used as folk medicine for centuries throughout Asia, the nutraceutical industry has grown alongside the expansion and exploration of modern technology.

One example is a traditional Japanese drug called 'Kampo' which is derived from many medicinal plants. This test was done to investigate the pharmacological effects of functional foods and Kampo medicine. The experiments were performed using disease models. When extracts were taken from Kampo and functional foods and were administered there was a lowered pro-inflammatory rate.

Criticism
Because nutraceuticals are unregulated, these supplements are sold by marketing hype rather than being based on actual clinical evidence. There is no compelling evidence for efficacy in nutraceuticals. After scientists disputed the benefits of nutraceuticals like probiotics in yogurt, Danone was forced to pay millions for falsely claiming its products Actimel and Activia boosted the immune system.

See also
 Medical food
 Health claims on food labels
 Cosmeceutical for cosmetic products with quasi-medicinal claims
Probiotic

References

Further reading
 Pathak, Y.V. (editor, 2010). Handbook of Nutraceuticals (vol. 1): Ingredients, Formulations, and Applications. CRC Press.

External links
Agriculture and Agri-Food Canada, Functional Foods and Nutraceuticals, 2007
US FDA/CFSAN - Dietary Supplements

Food science
Nutrition
Pharmacy